Mount Hale is a mountain (3,595 m) standing 1.5 mi NW of Mount Davis in the main ridge of the Sentinel Range, Antarctica. Discovered by the Marie Byrd Land Traverse party, 1957–58, under Charles R. Bentley, and named for Daniel P. Hale, auroral physicist at Byrd Station and member of the traverse party.

See also
 Mountains in Antarctica

References

Ellsworth Mountains
Mountains of Ellsworth Land